Not to be confused with Lennox Passage (waterway).

Lennox Passage is a community in Richmond County, Nova Scotia. It borders Louisdale, Nova Scotia. It was known as Lennox Ferry, but changed its name in the early 1900s.  A bridge was completed in 1919 to connect Isle Madame.

References

External links
Nova Scotia Museum

Communities in Richmond County, Nova Scotia
General Service Areas in Nova Scotia